Uwe Ampler  (born 11 October 1964) is a retired track and road cyclist who competed for East Germany  at the 1988 Summer Olympics in Seoul, South Korea. There he won the gold medal in the men's team time trial, alongside Jan Schur, Mario Kummer, and Maik Landsmann.

Ampler won the Peace Race in 1987, 1988, 1989 and 1998.

In August 1999 he tested positive for steroids during the Sachsen Tour and admitted his error. His father, Klaus Ampler, was also a famous cyclist.

Major results

1983
1st Stage 1 Okolo Slovenska
1985
3rd Overall Peace Race
1st Stage 4
1986
1st Prologue Peace Race
3rd Overall Tour du Vaucluse
1st Stage 1
1987
1st  Overall Peace Race
1st Stages 8, 9 (ITT) & 10
2nd Overall Tour du Vaucluse
1st Prologue
10th Overall Tour of Sweden
1988
1st  Team time trial, Summer Olympics (with Mario Kummer, Jan Schur and Maik Landsmann)
1st  Overall Peace Race
1st Prologue & Stage 6 (ITT)
5th Overall GP Tell
1st Stage 7b
1989
1st  Overall Peace Race
1st Stages 9 & 11
5th Overall Circuit Cycliste Sarthe
1st Stage 4a
1990
1st Stage 10 Tour de Suisse
1st Stage 4 Setmana Catalana de Ciclisme
4th Overall Volta a la Comunitat Valenciana
9th Overall Vuelta a España
1st Young rider classification
1991
1st Stage 6 Paris-Nice
6th Overall Tour de Romandie
1992
1st Grand Prix of Aargau Canton
1993
5th Overall Tour of the Basque Country
1998
1st  Overall Peace Race
1999
10th Overall Tour de Langkawi

See also
List of doping cases in cycling
List of sportspeople sanctioned for doping offences

References

External links

1964 births
Living people
People from Zerbst
People from Bezirk Magdeburg
East German male cyclists
East German track cyclists
Cyclists at the 1988 Summer Olympics
Olympic cyclists of East Germany
Olympic gold medalists for East Germany
Doping cases in cycling
German sportspeople in doping cases
Olympic medalists in cycling
Tour de Suisse stage winners
Cyclists from Saxony-Anhalt
Medalists at the 1988 Summer Olympics
Recipients of the Patriotic Order of Merit in gold